{{DISPLAYTITLE:C18H24O3}}
The molecular formula C18H24O3 may refer to:

 10β,17β-Dihydroxyestra-1,4-dien-3-one
 Doisynolic acid
 Epiestriol
 16β,17α-Epiestriol
 17α-Epiestriol
 Estriol
 Hydroxyestradiols
 15α-Hydroxyestradiol
 2-Hydroxyestradiol
 4-Hydroxyestradiol